(lit. 'beautiful form') is the Ainu name, sung in yukar, for a grouping of geological features in Hokkaidō, Japan. In 2009 Pirikanoka was nationally designated a Place of Scenic Beauty, with the first six sites listed below, with an extension in 2012 to include the next three, and another in 2014 for the tenth. Each has its own name in Ainu.

List of features

See also
 Monuments of Japan
 List of Places of Scenic Beauty of Japan (Hokkaido)

References

Geography of Hokkaido
Places of Scenic Beauty